Nicholas Bolton (born March 10, 2000) is an American football linebacker for the Kansas City Chiefs of the National Football League (NFL). He played college football at Missouri, and was drafted by the Chiefs in the second round of the 2021 NFL Draft.

Early years
Bolton attended Lone Star High School in Frisco, Texas. He had 130 tackles and five interceptions as a senior and 111 tackles and one interception his junior season. He committed to the University of Missouri to play college football.

College career
As a true freshman at Missouri in 2018, he played in all 13 games recording 22 tackles and one sack. As a sophomore in 2019 he became a starter. He was named first-team All-SEC after finishing with 103 tackles, two interceptions and one sack. During a COVID-19 scheduled ten game season in 2020, Nick finished with 95 tackles and two sacks to close out his junior year. He was once again named first-team All-SEC. In addition, he received AP Second-team All-American honor.

Professional career

Bolton was selected by the Kansas City Chiefs in the second round (58th overall) of the 2021 NFL Draft. On May 13, 2021, Bolton officially signed with the Chiefs on a $5.84 million deal.

Bolton was put on the Reserve/COVID-19 list on December 21, 2021. He was activated on December 25, 2021. In Week 18, against the Denver Broncos, he recorded an 86-yard fumble return for a touchdown in the 28–24 victory. As a rookie, he appeared in 16 games and started 12. He finished with 112 total tackles and three passes defended. He was named to the 2021 PFWA All-Rookie Team.

In the 2022 NFL season, Bolton recorded two sacks, 180 total tackles (108 solo), two interceptions, three passes defended, and one forced fumble. He finished second in the NFL in combined and solo tackles in the 2022 season. Bolton helped the Chiefs reach Super Bowl LVII where they defeated the Philadelphia Eagles 38-35. Bolton led the Chiefs with nine tackles and scored a defensive touchdown on a fumble from quarterback Jalen Hurts.

NFL career statistics

Regular season

Playoffs

References

External links

Kansas City Chiefs bio
Missouri Tigers bio

2000 births
Living people
People from Frisco, Texas
Players of American football from Texas
Sportspeople from the Dallas–Fort Worth metroplex
American football linebackers
Missouri Tigers football players
Kansas City Chiefs players